Raymond John Fisman (born January 29, 1971) is an American economist who is the Slater Family Professor in Behavioral Economics at Boston University.

References

External links
Faculty page

Living people
1971 births
American economists
Behavioral economists
Boston University faculty